Tahrohon Wayne Shannon (born February 24, 1978) is an American banker and politician who served as a member of the Oklahoma House of Representatives for the 62nd district from 2007 to 2015. In a ceremony on January 8, 2013, Shannon took the oath of office to be Oklahoma's first African-American speaker of the House. Shannon stepped down as the speaker to run for the Republican nomination in the 2014 United States Senate special election in Oklahoma to succeed Tom Coburn.

Despite Tea Party support and endorsements that included U.S. Senator Ted Cruz of Texas and former Alaska Governor Sarah Palin, Shannon lost the Republican nomination for the Senate to U.S. Representative James Lankford by almost 20 points.

In March 2022, Shannon announced that he was running in the 2022 United States Senate special election in Oklahoma to succeed the retiring Republican Jim Inhofe. He was defeated by U.S. Representative Markwayne Mullin in the Republican primary by more than 26 points.

Early life and education
Born in Oklahoma on February 24, 1978, to a Chickasaw father and an African-American mother (both of whom were history teachers), Shannon earned a Bachelor of Arts degree in communications from Cameron University and a Juris Doctor from Oklahoma City University School of Law.

Career 

Shannon worked as a field representative for former Congressman J. C. Watts and later served in the same position for Congressman Tom Cole. An enrolled citizen of the Chickasaw Nation, he worked as the chief administrative officer for Chickasaw Nation Enterprises.

Oklahoma House of Representatives 

Shannon was first elected to the Oklahoma House of Representatives in 2006, defeating opponent Janice Drewry in the general election. He rose to leadership in the state House, where he served as deputy majority whip in his first term, chaired the transportation committee in his second term and was elected speaker-designate in his third term. On January 8, 2013, Shannon took the oath of office to be the speaker of the Oklahoma House of Representatives.

He has advocated for identifying and selling off state-owned properties that were not being fully utilized. Shannon sponsored an eight-year plan to divert state income tax revenue to repairing Oklahoma's structurally deficient bridges.

As speaker, Shannon authored legislation to create a long-term plan to address the maintenance of state-owned properties and consolidate property management entities.

The first sale under the program to sell off state-owned properties was the sale of a former studio for the state public television station for $130,000. The next properties up for sale are a townlot in Buffalo and 5.58 acres in Marietta.

Shannon advocated a controversial measure to require Oklahoma recipients of the Supplemental Nutrition Assistance Program (food stamps) to perform at least 35 hours of work activities or be denied aid. The work requirement was scaled back after the cost of providing job training to SNAP recipients became clear.

GOPAC, an organization whose mission it is to support up-and-coming Republican leaders, added Shannon to its national advisory board in 2013.

House district 62 encompasses Lawton, Oklahoma and its surrounding communities.

US Senate campaigns 
Shannon stepped down as the speaker to run for the Republican nomination in the 2014 United States Senate special election in Oklahoma to succeed Tom Coburn.

Despite Tea Party support and endorsements that included U.S. Senator Ted Cruz of Texas and former Alaska Governor Sarah Palin, Shannon lost the Republican nomination for the Senate to U.S. Representative James Lankford by almost 20 points.

In March 2022, Shannon announced that he was running in the 2022 United States Senate special election in Oklahoma to succeed the retiring Republican Jim Inhofe. He was endorsed by Bill Anoatubby, the Governor of the Chickasaw Nation. Shannon finished in second place in the 13 candidate field, advancing to a runoff against Markwayne Mullin. Mullin defeated Shannon in the runoff.

Personal life 
Shannon attends Bethlehem Baptist Church in Lawton. He met his wife, Devon (née Murray), at Cameron University and married her in 2001. They have two children, a daughter and son. Today, he is the CEO of Chickasaw Community Bank in Oklahoma City.

References

External links
 TW Shannon Profile and Videos – Chickasaw.TV
 

|-

1978 births
Living people
American bankers
21st-century American lawyers
21st-century American politicians
20th-century Native Americans
21st-century Native American politicians
African-American state legislators in Oklahoma
Black Native American people
Cameron University alumni
Candidates in the 2014 United States elections
Candidates in the 2022 United States Senate elections
Chickasaw Nation state legislators in Oklahoma
Native American Christians
Oklahoma City University School of Law alumni
Oklahoma lawyers
People from Lawton, Oklahoma
Speakers of the Oklahoma House of Representatives
Republican Party members of the Oklahoma House of Representatives
21st-century African-American politicians
20th-century African-American people
Baptists from Oklahoma
Protestants from Oklahoma